Gmelin's white-toothed shrew (Crocidura gmelini) is a species of mammal in the family Soricidae. It is found in Afghanistan, China, Iran, and Pakistan.

References

Crocidura
Mammals of Afghanistan
Mammals of Pakistan
Mammals described in 1811
Taxonomy articles created by Polbot